Zetman (stylized as ZETMAN) is a Japanese manga series written and illustrated by Masakazu Katsura. The series started as a 49-page one-shot in the 1994 Autumn Special of Shueisha's shōnen manga magazine Weekly Shōnen Jump. A more mature and full-fledged series ran in Shueisha's seinen manga magazine Weekly Young Jump from 2002 to 2014. A 13-episode anime television series adaptation by TMS Entertainment was broadcast in Japan from April to June 2012. In North America, the anime series was licensed for English language release by Viz Media.

Plot
The story starts off with a face-off between two rival superheroes, ZET and Alphas, and then traces their origins – Jin Kanzaki, a young man with the ability to transform into a superhuman being known as ZET, and Kouga Amagi, a young man with a strong sense of justice who uses technology to fight as Alphas.

The fates of these two men and those around them intertwine as they fight to protect mankind and destroy monstrous abominations known as Players, who ironically are the creations of the Amagi Corporation, the company founded by Kouga's grandfather, Mitsugai Amagi.

Characters
   / ZET

A mysterious young man. Jin is a result of the N.E.T. Project by the Amagi Corporation to create the perfect being to fight and destroy the escaped Players. He was however released by Gorō Kanzaki, who wanted nothing more for Jin than to grow up as a normal human. After the death of Kanzaki, Jin stayed with Akemi Kawakami until he witnessed her 'death' under the hands of the Amagi Corp., in an effort to retrieve their creation.
Jin is able to transform a creature known as "ZET", a mutant possessing superhuman abilities, but often mistaken for another Player. The transformation is slow, though it may be accelerated due to extreme rage and conditions.
   / 

A young man both academically and sports-inclined. He is the grandson of Mitsugai Amagi, founder of the Amagi Corporation. Due to his attraction to an anime 'Ginga Chōjin Alphas', Kouga has developed a strong sense of justice since young. Urged by his encounter with Jin during a fire accident, he had been depending on a trio of researchers since middle school for gadgets which could assist him in his escapades. He lost his right forearm during his captivity by Jirou Nakata, together with his sense of justice.
After learning about the Players and his grandfather's involvement in the project, he initiates the Alphas Project with the trio, who created a high-performance combat body suit resembling Kouga's childhood hero, complete with high-tech weaponry and gadgets, to combat his grandfather's creations. He is very protective of his family, especially his sister, Konoha.

Sister to Kouga and granddaughter of Mitsugai. She bears a distinct dislike to her grandfather due to childhood trauma. Konoha first met Jin during her secret volunteer work with her mother when they were still small, and has been harboring feelings for him ever since. When she saw Jin emerge from the building destroyed by the Fire Player and see him faint, she picks up his grandfather's pendant, which she continued to hold onto until the Jin clones stole it from her during the assault on Amagi manor. She is unaware of Jin being ZET, nor of her family's involvement with the Players.

A tomboyish teenage girl. She has had constant headaches since she was born, leading her to go to the nurse's office quite often as a result. Because of this, students thought she was just slacking off, and was bullied by them, leaving her traumatized and unwilling to go to high school. After this, her parents started becoming apathetic to her, forcing her to run away. She met Jin as he was living in the slum she ran away to and has developed romantic feelings for him.

Amagai Corporation

Founder and ex-CEO of the Amagi Corporation, who believed in a distinct divide between the rich and the poor. In the pursuit of his dream to create the perfect artificial humans, he initiated the N.E.T. Project, but it eventually led to the escape of his creations, the Players. Having a heavy sense of responsibility for the incident, Mitsugai then commenced Project Z.E.T. to set things right, though once again his plans were foiled by the betrayal of Kanzaki. He then became hell-bent on retrieving ZET back after countless failures to create a new one.
Mitsugai's methods were often hard-handed, but after the destruction of his laboratory a second time by Players, he seems to have softened up, now giving Jin a choice of either becoming ZET or living as a normal human, though it is unknown if this is just a facade or not. He has also agreed to help Kouga in any way he can.

Son of Mitsugai, husband of Youko and father to Kouga and Konoha. Current CEO of the Amagi Corporation. An arrogant, sober and cold-hearted man and with elitist attitude because of his family's name. He was named one of the masterminds of the NET Project by Jirou, but he feigns ignorance to all the various secret Projects under Amagi Corp.

An executive in Amagi Corp. and assistant to Seizou Kouga. He supports Kouga's actions as Alphas, though he only does so to prevent him from taking over Amagi Corp. After being left in a vegetative state, he was brought back by an unknown individual, revealing to Kouga that he was in league with him in a plan to bring down the Amagi clan, which would allow Hayami to take position as the new C.E.O. of Amagi Corp. Soon after his revelation to Kouga, he injects him with one of the insects made by a clone of Ichirō, in order for Kouga's body to reach superhuman levels and help him achieve his agenda. Afterwards, he, Seiji and Suzuki ("Katou") launch a terrorist attack on a New Year's Eve party that Seizou is hosting, in an attempt to make Seizou confess to all the injustices that he committed on film. One of the hostages tries to grab a machine gun from one of the underlings, and in the chaos, Hayami is shot in the chest and seemingly killed.

EVOL

The mysterious leader of EVOL, he intends to conquer the world and wipe out humanity. It is unknown what the extent of his power is, though he has the power to keep Players from reverting, and his Player form was modeled after a wolf (while he was fully organic). He was one of the original 13 Players that rebelled, and the creator of the G2 and G3 Players.
 / 

The brains of EVOL. He seems to have an interest in Jin, as he implanted a ceramic spike into Jin's heart in order to allow him to freely become ZET. He is shown to be merciless when it comes to getting what he wants. As Anvil, Haitani appears as an angelic being with demonic wings, the complete opposite of Inzen's Degel form. He has even stated that his powers are the opposite of Degel's, so they are pretty much neutralized by each other. The eye in the middle of his chest, if gazed into by Inzen/Degel, is able to keep him frozen in place. He desires to become one with Degel, though is unable to because of their opposing natures.

Little is known about him except for his appearances to kill off defective Players and that there are dozens of him. He also shows some interest in ZET and wishes to fight with him.
 / 
Another high ranking EVOL. He and Seiji are two of the three main EVOLs, along with their mysterious leader. He is shown to disapprove of the tactics Seiji uses to get what he wants, and is weary of him doing whatever he wants. He is also a firm believer of the ends justifying the means. Inzen is shown to be strong enough to defeat Kouga/Alphasz in an instant. When he first appeared, he and Kosuri/Bat Player kidnapped the creator of the "Ginga Chōjin Alphasz" anime series for unknown reasons. He later appears during Haitani's attack on Amagi Corp., intent on ending the rogue Player for his betrayal as well as kill Jin, believing him to be too dangerous to allow to live.
As Degel, he appears in a towering demonic form with angelic wings, the complete opposite of Haitani's Anvil form. He is also able to shoot demonic-appearing rods out of his hands, which have the ability to transform into soldiers that follow his commands.

Other characters

The father of Ichirou, one of the Players. Jirou is a former scientist of Amagi Corp. and an expert in researching the creation of the Players. He admits that the only people he ever cared for were his wife and son, and was devastated when he witnessed his son's murder. When he discovered that the Players were to be used as a means of entertainment, he spoke out against the idea to Kabe, and was sealed inside his underground laboratory soon after, along with the corpse of his son. He soon revived Ichirou by turning him into a Player, and the two survived in the laboratory for sixteen years on nothing but water and medications. When they were set free, he began to plot his revenge against Amagi Corp., along with Ichirou and Katou, a greedy Amagi employee.

A pioneer in both the N.E.T. and Z.E.T. Projects in the Amagi Corporation, Kanzaki escaped with an infant Jin in defiance to turning his 'child' into a killing machine. Later disguised himself as a homeless old man and posed as the grandfather of the growing Jin. He was killed in a bid to protect Jin from an awakened Player. Kanzaki's head was however retrieved by the Amagi Corp. and hooked up to a computer so as to obtain unknown information about ZET/Jin.

The foster parent to Jin after Kanzaki. Always addressed as "old lady" or "auntie" by Jin, Akemi was an ex-hostess who had a son she lost custody of to her ex-husband. Her face was slashed by a crazed client, who in turn suffered near fatal injuries by a young Jin, having recalled how his grandfather was killed. She has been selling crepes at a roadside stall ever since. She was seemingly killed right in front of Jin's eyes in a bid to let Jin return to the Amagi Corp., but was later revealed by Mitsugai to be alive, and was given back custody of her son with the help of Amagi Corp.

Seizou's wife, and mother to Kouga and Konoha. She was chastised by Mitsugai for doing volunteer work in secret, resulting in Konoha's childhood trauma. She then ran away from home while continuing her volunteer work, and never returned. However, she and Seizou are not officially divorced yet. It is eventually revealed that she has been staying at the home of her lover, Suzuki. She and Konoha are soon kidnapped by Seiji and Suzuki, the latter revealing that Seizou funded human experiments on his wife and his son, Katou. Soon afterwards, Amagi Tower starts to be destroyed, and in the chaos, she is seen falling into an inferno, but she was saved by Suzuki.

A friend of Jin's and Youko's lover. After Youko ran away, she went to live with him, where they continued to help the homeless. After Jin was nearly captured, he offers him and those with him sanctuary. Soon afterwards, it is revealed that he is working with Seiji, and the two of them kidnap Konoha and Youko. During Seiji's planned attack on Amagi Corp., he reveals to Seizou, Youko and Konoha that Seizou's funding of human experiments cost him the lives of his wife and his son, Katou. Thus, he reveals that he was "Katou", the mastermind behind the incident with Jirou.

Media

Manga

Written and illustrated by Masakazu Katsura, Zetman was first published as a four-one-shot story in Shueisha's shōnen manga magazine Weekly Shōnen Jump from 1989 to 1994. Zetman started serialization as a full-fledged series in the seinen manga magazine Weekly Young Jump on October 31, 2002, and finished on July 24, 2014. Shueisha collected its chapters in twenty tankōbon volumes, released from November 19, 2003, to October 17, 2014.

Outside Japan, the series is licensed by Editorial Ivrea in Argentina, by Grupo Editorial Vid in Mexico, by Star Comics in Italy, by Glénat in Spain, and in France by Tonkam.

Anime
Zetman was adapted into an anime television series directed by Osamu Nabeshima, with screenplay by Atsuhiro Tomioka, and character design by Hirotoshi Takaya. Gabriele Roberto supervised the music. It was broadcast for 13 episodes on Yomiuri TV, Tokyo MX and BS11 from April 3 to June 26, 2012.

The anime was available on streaming on Hulu and Viz Media's streaming service. The series started streaming on RetroCrush on November 12, 2021.

Episode list

Reception

By October 2011, the manga had sold 3.5 million copies.

Sébastien Kimbergt of Animeland noted that the author's previous tales were about "teens' trifles", in contrast to Zetman'''s "brutal adventures with a profound darkness", and that they preferred Zetman to the author's other works. Animeland noted that Zetman was serialised over a period of many years, which Animeland says gave "the advantage of time to refine the script". Mickaël Géreaume from Planet BD felt that the first volume was inspired by the author's great love of Batman, finding it surprising considering the author's other works were romantic comedies.

Notes

References

Further reading
"Dossier Zetman''", Animeland issue #125, October 2006, p 32-34 (issue teaser)

External links
  
 Zetman Anime Streaming on Viz Media
 

2012 anime television series debuts
2002 manga
Action anime and manga
Japanese adult animated superhero television series
Masakazu Katsura
Science fiction anime and manga
Seinen manga
Shueisha franchises
Shueisha manga
Superheroes in anime and manga
TMS Entertainment
Tokyo MX original programming
Viz Media anime
Yomiuri Telecasting Corporation original programming